Brian Chevreuil (born 26 February 1997) is a professional footballer who plays as a midfielder for Championnat National club Borgo. Born in France, he represents Haiti at international level.

Club career
Chevreuil signed his first professional contract on 27 June 2017 with Châteauroux. He made his professional debut for the club in a 1–0 Ligue 2 loss to Valenciennes on 4 August 2017.

International career
Born in France to a Haitian father and a Réunionais mother, Chevreuil represents Haiti internationally. He represented the Haiti U20s at the 2017 CONCACAF U-20 Championship. Chevreuil made three appearances in total, scoring in his debut against Saint Kitts and Nevis U20.

Chevreuil made a FIFA-unrecognised debut for the senior Haiti national team in a 1–0 friendly win over UAE on 10 November 2017. His first FIFA-recognised match for Haiti was on 29 May 2018 in a 4–0 friendly loss to Argentina. He scored his first international goal in his third appearance for the national team as Haiti beat Jordan 2–0 in a friendly in Riffa.

International goals

References

External links
 
 
 
 
 Brian Chevreuil at football365.fr 

1997 births
Living people
Footballers from Paris
Association football midfielders
Citizens of Haiti through descent
Haitian footballers
Haiti international footballers
Haiti under-20 international footballers
French footballers
Ligue 2 players
Championnat National 2 players
Championnat National 3 players
LB Châteauroux players
SO Romorantin players
Bourges 18 players
Bourges Foot 18 players
FC Bastia-Borgo players
Haitian people of Réunionnais descent
French sportspeople of Haitian descent
French people of Réunionnais descent